Galaganath is a small village located near Haveri, in the Haveri District, Karnataka. Located here is the famous Galageshwar Shiva Temple built during the rule of the Western Chalukyas. This large temple faces east and is situated along the Tungabhadra River. The rivers Tunga and Varada join at Galaganath.

History

Galaganath was formerly known as Palluni. The Galageshwar temple, an example of the Chalukya style of architecture, was built here around the 11th century. Sri Venkatesh Galaganath (Kadambari Pitamaha) worshiped at the Galageshwar temple, and he wrote his novels on the temple premises.

Galageshwar temple

The temple faces to east and it is situated along the Tungabhadra river. the temple consists of a huge Shiva Linga in a closed hall; it is called Sparsha linga. The temple has an unusual pyramidal basement and a large open hall. The Gopura (tower) is decorated with plain architectural elements while the wall panels of the back of the hall have some fine decorations. The interior has numerous niches containing figural sculpture including Ganesha.

Inscriptions
A large inscription slab in the open hall of Galageshwar temple dates from 1080 AD and records a grant to the God Galageshwar. The date gives an indication of the era when the temple was built.

The inscription here informs about the prevalence of the tradition of dance and music. The high state of development which the art of music had reached in the 11th century A.D. can be gathered from an inscription of Chalukya king Vikramaditya from Galaganath, Haveri Taluk and Haveri District, North Karnataka, which mentions a certain Mokhari Barmmayya, a musician of high order, titled Battisaraga-bahu-kala-Brahma meaning skilled in 32 ragas.

Also visit
 North Karnataka
 Tourism in North Karnataka
 Ranebennur
 Haveri
 Chaudayyadanapur
 Mylar Lingeshwar Temple at Mylar
 Hangal
 Bankapur
 Kaginele

References

Villages in Haveri district
Hindu temples in Haveri district
Chalukya dynasty
Western Chalukya Empire